
The Bulwer-Lytton Fiction Contest (BLFC) is a tongue-in-cheek contest, held annually and sponsored by the English Department of San Jose State University in San Jose, California. Entrants are invited "to compose the opening sentence to the worst of all possible novels" – that is, one which is deliberately bad.

According to the official rules, the prize for winning the contest is "a pittance". The 2008 winner received $250, while the 2014 winners' page said the grand prize winner received "about $150".

The contest was started in 1982 by Professor Scott E. Rice of the English Department at San Jose State University and is named for English novelist and playwright Edward George Bulwer-Lytton, author of the much-quoted first line "It was a dark and stormy night". This opening, from the 1830 novel Paul Clifford, reads in full:

The first year of the competition attracted just three entries, but it went public the next year, received media attention, and attracted 10,000 entries. There are now several subcategories, such as detective fiction, romance novels, Western novels, and purple prose. Sentences that are notable but not quite bad enough to merit the Grand Prize or a category prize are awarded Dishonorable Mentions.

Winning entrants

The winning entries are available at the contest website.

Collections
Six books collecting the best BLFC entries have been published:
 It Was a Dark and Stormy Night (1984), 
 Son of "It Was a Dark and Stormy Night" (1986), 
 Bride of Dark and Stormy (1988), 
 It Was a Dark & Stormy Night: The Final Conflict (1992), 
 Dark and Stormy Rides Again (1996), 
 It Was a Dark and Stormy Night (2007),  

An audio cassette of the winning entries in the BLFC was also released:
 It Was a Dark and Stormy Night (1997), audio cassette, .

See also
 Purple prose
 Lyttle Lytton Contest, a derivative favoring extremely short first sentences
 Bad Sex in Fiction Award run by Literary Review magazine
 Bookseller/Diagram Prize for Oddest Title of the Year
 International Imitation Hemingway Competition

Notes

External links
 Bulwer Lytton Fiction Contest web site
 "From Worst to First: Literary Award Marks the Pits of Prose" Chronicle of Higher Education News blog (2007)

Culture of San Jose, California
San Jose State University
Humorous literary awards
Writing contests
Recurring events established in 1982
Edward Bulwer-Lytton